Swept Away is the fifteenth studio album by American R&B singer Diana Ross, released on September 13, 1984 by RCA Records in North America and by Capitol Records in Europe. It was Ross' fourth of six albums released by the label during the decade.

Overview
This album yielded several hit singles, the most successful of which, "Missing You", became Ross' final Top Ten to date on the Billboard Hot 100, peaking at No. 10. It was produced by Lionel Richie and was a tribute to late soul singer Marvin Gaye, Ross and Richie's former Motown Records label-mate. Other singles included the Daryl Hall and Arthur Baker-produced "Swept Away" and the Julio Iglesias duet, "All of You". All three of these singles were accompanied by popular music videos.

The album also included the European single "Touch by Touch" which reached the Top 10 in Austria, Belgium and Norway and also charting inside the Top 20 in Canada, Sweden and the Netherlands. The US single "Telephone" – produced by Bernard Edwards of Chic – was directed at R&B radio and scored a No. 13 hit on the Billboard Hot R&B/Hip-Hop Songs chart. Edwards' Chic partner Nile Rodgers played guitar on the new wave song "It's Your Move".

The album also included cover versions of Fontella Bass' 1960s R&B hit "Rescue Me" and the Bob Dylan classic "Forever Young" which she later performed as the finale to her 1987 ABC TV special Diana Ross: Red Hot Rhythm and Blues.

Swept Away was certified Gold by the end of 1984. It peaked at No. 26 on Billboard Pop albums chart, also reaching No. 40 in the UK. The album also made the Top Ten in the Netherlands and Sweden.

Re-release in 2014
The album was remastered and re-released as an "Expanded Edition" on September 2, 2014 by Funky Town Grooves, with bonus material on a second CD.

Track listing

Notes

Personnel
Credits are adapted from the Swept Away liner notes.

 Diana Ross – lead and backing vocals
 Arthur Baker – keyboards, synthesizers/Yamaha DX7
 Arthur Barrow – keyboards/Yamaha DX7, bass, arrangements (2)
 Jeff Beck – guitars
 Nile Rodgers – guitars
 G. E. Smith – guitars
 Bernard Edwards – bass
 John "JR" Robinson – drums (1)
 Dave Weckl – drums/Linn 9000
 Michael Brecker – saxophone
 Randy Brecker – trumpet
 Daryl Hall – backing vocals (5)
 Julio Iglesias – lead vocals (8)

Production 
 Producers – James Anthony Carmichael and Lionel Richie (Track 1); Diana Ross (Tracks 2, 3, 4, 7, 9 & 10); Arthur Baker and Daryl Hall (Track 5); Bernard Edwards (Track 6); Ramón Arcusa and Richard Perry (Track 8).
 Co-Producer on Track 8 – Albert Hammond 
 Engineer – Larry Alexander
 Assistant Engineer – Dave Greenberg
 Mastered by Ted Jensen at Sterling Sound (New York, NY).
 Contractor – Sephra Herman
 Art Director – Ria Lewerke
 Design – Sue Reilly
 Photography – Francisco Scavullo

Charts

Certifications

See also
 Floral Shoppe, of which track "リサフランク420 / 現代のコンピュ" came into prominence as a vaporwave song that sampled Ross' "It's Your Move" extensively.

References

External links
 

1984 albums
Diana Ross albums
Capitol Records albums
RCA Records albums
Albums produced by Bernard Edwards
Albums produced by Richard Perry
Albums produced by Arthur Baker (musician)
Albums produced by James Anthony Carmichael
Albums produced by Lionel Richie